These are the official results of the Women's 5,000 metres event at the 1997 World Championships in Athens, Greece. There were a total number of 42 participating athletes, with two qualifying heats and the final held on Saturday 1997-08-09.

Results

First round
7 August 1997

Final
9 August 1997

See also
 1992 Women's Olympic 3,000 metres (Barcelona)
 1993 Women's World Championships 3,000 metres (Stuttgart)
 1994 Women's European Championships 3,000 metres (Helsinki)
 1995 Women's World Championships 5,000 metres (Gothenburg)
 1996 Women's Olympic 5,000 metres (Atlanta)
 1998 Women's European Championships 5,000 metres (Budapest)
 1999 Women's World Championships 5,000 metres (Seville)
 2000 Women's Olympic 5,000 metres (Sydney)

References
 Results

 
5000 metres at the World Athletics Championships
1997 in women's athletics